Bjordal Church is a parish church of the Church of Norway in Høyanger Municipality in Vestland county, Norway. It is located in the village of Bjordal. It is one of the two churches for the Bjordal og Ortnevik parish which is part of the Sunnfjord prosti (deanery) in the Diocese of Bjørgvin. The white, wooden church was built in a long church design in 1906 using plans drawn up byusing plans drawn up by the architect Victor Nordan, the son of the famous Norwegian church architect Jacob Wilhelm Nordan. The church seats about 160 people.

History
The people living around the Fuglesetfjorden had long desired a church of their own. Again in 1896, the people of Bjordal petitioned the government for their own church. It took three years, but in 1899, the government decided that an annex chapel (not a church) would be built. Planning began and after several years passed the church was completed. It was designed by Victor Nordan and it the lead builder was Jo Hove from Vik. The church was consecrated on 1 November 1906.

The church is not large, but it has a picturesque location on a hilltop overlooking the fjord. In 1953, the chapel received electric lighting and then in 1958 electric heating was installed. It originally the status of a chapel (and was named Bjordal Chapel) until 1 January 1997 when it was upgraded to a church. At the same time the new parish of Bjordal og Ortnevik was created with Ortnevik Church and Bjordal Church being the parish churches. This meant that all the people in Høyanger on the south side of the Sognefjorden now had their own parish.

See also
List of churches in Bjørgvin

References

Høyanger
Churches in Vestland
Long churches in Norway
Wooden churches in Norway
20th-century Church of Norway church buildings
Churches completed in 1906
1906 establishments in Norway